Wild Seed is a 1965 American drama romance film directed by Brian G. Hutton and starring Michael Parks and Celia Kaye. The film was shot in black and white.

Plot
17-year-old Daphne Simms (Kaye) learns of her biological father from letters left by her deceased mother. She runs away from her New York home and adopted parents in search of her father in Los Angeles. Unaware of the dangers on the road, she attempts to hitchhike but learns a valuable lesson early. A seemingly nice, middle-aged man offers her a ride then takes her into a deserted area where he tries to take advantage of her. She manages to escape, but she is left in the darkness in the middle of nowhere. She succeeds in finding the main road and eventually reaches a gas station. It is here she meets Fargo (Parks). Initially wary of his attention, they eventually start a conversation. Though it appears that Fargo's intentions are to hustle her for money, she agrees to allow him to help her get to California. Through run-ins with hobos and the police, arguments with and misunderstandings about each other, and a serious illness while on their journey, a close friendship forms, and they begin to have feelings for each other.

Upon arriving in L.A., Daphne finds her father, but she is disappointed. At the couple's hotel, Daphne's adopted parents arrive and ask her to accompany them home. They express forgiveness and a willingness to accept Fargo, suggesting they will help him settle in New York. Fargo rejects the offer and tells Daphne to go with her parents. Later that night as he leaves a bar, he finds Daphne waiting for him outside. She has decided to stay with him. Arms around each other, they walk along the dark street.

Cast
 Michael Parks as Fargo
 Celia Kaye as Daphne
 Ross Elliott as Mr. Collinge
 Woody Chambliss as Mr. Simms
 Rupert Crosse as Hobo
 Eva Novak as Mrs. Simms
 Norman Burton as Policeman
 Merritt Bohn as Constable
 Al Lettieri as Bartender

Production
The film was originally known as Daffy. The script originally was written in 1957 and sold to Marlon Brando's company, Pennebaker Productions. Initially considered as a starring vehicle for Brando, the actor was deemed too old for the part. The film was shot in 24 days. Producer Ruddy had two endings made, one with the lovers going their separate ways and the other with their staying together.

See also
List of American films of 1965

References

External links
 
 

1965 films
1965 romantic drama films
Films directed by Brian G. Hutton
American romantic drama films
Films scored by Richard Markowitz
1965 directorial debut films
1960s English-language films
1960s American films